In Greek mythology, Hyacinthus was a Lacedaemonian who is said to have moved to Athens.

Mythology 
In compliance with an oracle, to have caused his four daughters to be sacrificed on the tomb of the Cyclops Geraestus, for the purpose of delivering the city from famine and the plague, under which it was suffering during the war with Minos over the death of the latter's son Androgeos. Hyacinthus's daughters, who were sacrificed either to Athena or Persephone, were known in the Attic legends by the name of the "Hyacinthides", which they derived from their father.

The names and numbers of the Hyacinthides differ in the different writers. The author of the Bibliotheca mentions four (Antheis, Aegleis, Orthaea, and Lytaea), while Hyginus only mentions Antheis. One account represents them as married, although they were sacrificed as maidens, whence they are sometimes called simply . Stephanus of Byzantium calls one of them Lousia, eponym of a demos, Lousia, of the phyle Oineis. Some traditions conflate them with the daughters of Erechtheus and relate that they received their name from the village of Hyacinthus, where they were sacrificed at the time when Athens was attacked by the Eleusinians and Thracians, or Thebans. Some of these traditions further confound them with Agraulos, Herse, and Pandrosus, or with the Hyades. The story of Leos and his daughters is also comparable to that of Hyacinthus and the Hyacinthides.

Notes

References 

 Apollodorus, The Library with an English Translation by Sir James George Frazer, F.B.A., F.R.S. in 2 Volumes, Cambridge, MA, Harvard University Press; London, William Heinemann Ltd. 1921. ISBN 0-674-99135-4. Online version at the Perseus Digital Library. Greek text available from the same website.
 Gaius Julius Hyginus, Fabulae from The Myths of Hyginus translated and edited by Mary Grant. University of Kansas Publications in Humanistic Studies. Online version at the Topos Text Project.
 Maurus Servius Honoratus, In Vergilii carmina comentarii. Servii Grammatici qui feruntur in Vergilii carmina commentarii; recensuerunt Georgius Thilo et Hermannus Hagen. Georgius Thilo. Leipzig. B. G. Teubner. 1881. Online version at the Perseus Digital Library.
 Stephanus of Byzantium, Stephani Byzantii Ethnicorum quae supersunt, edited by August Meineike (1790-1870), published 1849. A few entries from this important ancient handbook of place names have been translated by Brady Kiesling. Online version at the Topos Text Project.
 Suida, Suda Encyclopedia translated by Ross Scaife, David Whitehead, William Hutton, Catharine Roth, Jennifer Benedict, Gregory Hays, Malcolm Heath Sean M. Redmond, Nicholas Fincher, Patrick Rourke, Elizabeth Vandiver, Raphael Finkel, Frederick Williams, Carl Widstrand, Robert Dyer, Joseph L. Rife, Oliver Phillips and many others. Online version at the Topos Text Project.

Laconian characters in Greek mythology
Attic mythology